Milton Griffiths (born 30 April 1975) is a retired Jamaican footballer. After playing for William Carey University in the US, as well as Harbour View in Jamaica, Griffiths joined German club Eintracht Braunschweig for the 2000-01 season. After one year in Germany Griffiths returned to Jamaica. He was also capped for the Jamaica national team.

Honours

 National Premier League champion: 2000
 National A-League topscorer: 2002

References

External links 
 
 

1975 births
Living people
People from Montego Bay
Jamaican footballers
Jamaica international footballers
Association football midfielders
Harbour View F.C. players
Eintracht Braunschweig players
Jamaican expatriate footballers
Expatriate footballers in Germany
Jamaican expatriate sportspeople in Germany